Civic Alliance (Građanski savez) is a centre-left political party in Bosnia and Herzegovina. It was founded in 2016 by Reuf Bajrović. The party's mayoral candidate in Bihać municipality won the mayoral race in 2016. In 2018, the Civic Alliance entered a coalition with the Demokratska fronta for all parliamentary races and the Presidency of Bosnia and Herzegovina. The DF–GS coalition candidate Željko Komšić won the race for the Croat Member of Bosnia and Herzegovina Presidency and the coalition entered all parliaments.

References

Social democratic parties in Bosnia and Herzegovina